Saint Demetria (d. 362) was a virgin, martyr, and saint. Her parents were Saint Flavianus and Saint Dafrosa and her sister was Saint Bibiana; the entire family was martyred under the Roman emperor Julian, during his anti-Christian campaign after he came to power in 361. After Dafosa was killed, Demetria and Bibiana were put under house arrest; as historian Agnes Dunbar put it, "attempts were made to pervert them from the faith". According to hagiographer Alban Butler, the sisters, who spent their arrest in prayer and fasting, "were stripped of all they had in the world and suffered much from poverty" after the death of their parents. They were brought before the Roman prefect Apronianus, the same ruler who had condemned their parents, and were ordered to be executed. After she confessed her faith in Christ, Demetria fell down dead before the tribunal, in the presence of the judge, apparently from shock.

Demetria's relics, along with the relics of her mother and sister, are preserved inside an alabaster urn beneath the high altar of the little basilica of Santa Bibiana Church in Rome. Her feast day is June 21.

References

Works cited
 Craughwell, Thomas J. (2011). Saints Preserved: An Encyclopedia of Relics (1st ed.). New York: Image Books. . OCLC 676726893.

4th-century Christian martyrs
4th-century Christian saints
4th-century deaths
Late Ancient Christian female saints